Imam Ali Officers' University (acronym: , DĀʿAF), formerly known as Officers' School is the military academy of the Islamic Republic of Iran Army Ground Forces, located in Tehran, Iran. Cadets of the academy achieve the second lieutenant rank upon graduation and join the Ground Forces. It is considered one of the best  military academies in the region.

References 

Educational institutions established in 1921
1921 establishments in Iran
Universities in Tehran
Islamic Republic of Iran Army
Military education and training in Iran
Military academies